Nikolas Špalek (born 12 February 1997) is a Slovak professional footballer who plays as a winger for MTK Budapest.

Club career
Špalek was signed by Spartak Trnava in July 2014. He made his league debut for the club against Zlaté Moravce on 13 July 2014.

In January 2015, he was transferred to Žilina. In January 2018 he moved to Italian Brescia Calcio for €1 to 1.5 million. On 12 August 2022, Špalek signed with TSC in Serbia. In 2023, Špalek joined MTK Budapest on a permanent transfer and also received Hungarian citizneship to be elligible to play for the club.

International career
Špalek enjoyed his first nomination to senior national team in November 2019, for a double qualifying fixture against Croatia and Azerbaijan. He failed to make an appearance in either of the games.

Honours

MŠK Žilina
Fortuna Liga: Winners: 2016-17

References

External links

Corgoň Liga profile
Talenty-info profile
FS Agency profile
Futbalsfz profile

1997 births
Living people
Sportspeople from Šaľa
Slovak footballers
Slovakia under-21 international footballers
Slovakia youth international footballers
Association football midfielders
FC Nitra players
FC Spartak Trnava players
MŠK Žilina players
Brescia Calcio players
FK TSC Bačka Topola players
MTK Budapest FC players
Slovak Super Liga players
Serie A players
Serie B players
Serbian SuperLiga players
Nemzeti Bajnokság III players
Slovak expatriate footballers
Expatriate footballers in Italy
Slovak expatriate sportspeople in Italy
Expatriate footballers in Serbia
Slovak expatriate sportspeople in Serbia
Expatriate footballers in Hungary
Slovak expatriate sportspeople in Hungary